María Jimena Pérez (born 2 June 1984) is an Argentine volleyball player who is a member of the Argentina national team.

Career 
She participated at the 2011 FIVB Volleyball Women's World Cup.

References

External links 
 FIVB profile

1984 births
Living people
Argentine women's volleyball players
Volleyball players from Buenos Aires